The Batillus-class supertankers were a class of supertanker ships built in France in the late 1970s, with four ships of this class  built between 1976 and 1979.  Three of the ships were scrapped after less than ten years of oil transport service each, with the fourth one scrapped in 2003.

All four tankers were built in the Bassin C dock of the Chantiers de l'Atlantique shipyards at Saint Nazaire, France.

History

Vessels in class 
 , built in 1976, scrapped in 1986.
 , built in 1976, scrapped in 1986.
 , built in 1977, scrapped in 1983.
 , built in 1979, renamed Sea Brilliance, renamed Hellas Fos, renamed Sea Giant, scrapped in 2003.

Measurements
While being the largest ships ever built by gross tonnage until , the four Batillus-class ships were the second largest ever constructed when measuring deadweight tonnage or length overall, behind only the supertanker  (renamed five times, including to Knock Nevis), which existed from 1979 to 2010.

Unlike Seawise Giant and most other ULCCs, the Batillus-class vessels had twin screws, twin boilers of full size and power, and twin rudders.  As a result, in the event of an engine or other failure, they could continue operation with the remaining propeller and boiler.

See also
 List of world's longest ships

References

External links 
 Building the Batillus

Oil tankers
Ships built in France
Ships built by Chantiers de l'Atlantique